Life Processes is the second album by ¡Forward, Russia!, and was released in the UK on 14 April 2008. It was produced by former Minus the Bear keyboardist Matt Bayles at Red Room Recordings in Seattle, Washington. The first single from the album is "Breaking Standing". This album marks the end of the numerical song titles which featured on the debut album, Give Me a Wall. "Spanish Triangles" was put up for streaming or downloading before the release of the album.

Tracklisting

All tracks written by ¡Forward, Russia! 
 "Welcome to the Moment (The Rest of Your Life)" – 2:17
 "We Are Grey Matter" – 4:55
 "A Prospector Can Dream" – 3:21
 "Spring Is a Condition" – 5:16
 "Don't Say Reinvent What You Don't Understand" – 3:40
 "Some Buildings" – 6:47
 "Breaking Standing" – 4:16
 "Gravity & Heat" – 6:03
 "Fosbury in Discontent" – 3:48
 "A Shadow Is a Shadow Is a Shadow" – 3:20
 "Spanish Triangles" – 8:54

2008 albums
Cooking Vinyl albums
¡Forward, Russia! albums